Aarons is a Jewish patronymic surname, meaning "son of Aaron", the prefix Aaron meaning "lofty". It is most common amongst Jews in English language countries. It is uncommon as a given name. Notable people with the surname include:

 Al Aarons (1932–2015), American jazz trumpeter
 Anita Aarons (1912–2000), Australian-Canadian artist
 Asa Aarons (born 1956), American consumer reporter and photojournalist
 Bailey Aarons (born 1997), South African cricketer
 Bonnie Aarons, American actress
 Charles L. Aarons (1872–1952), Milwaukee County Circuit Court judge
 Edward S. Aarons (1916–1975), American author
 Eric Aarons (1919–2019), member of the third of four generations of the Aarons family who played leading roles in the Communist Party of Australia (CPA)
 George Aarons (born Gregory Podubisky; 1896–1980), American sculptor
 Jules Aarons (1921–2008), American physicist and photographer
 Laurie Aarons (1917–2005), Australian Communist leader
 Leon Aarons, British pharmacist
 Leroy F. Aarons (1933–2004), American journalist, editor, author, playwright
 Mark Aarons (born 1951), Australian journalist and author
 Max Aarons (born 2000), English footballer who plays for Norwich City
 Rolando Aarons (born 1995), English footballer who plays for Slovan Liberec, on loan from Newcastle United
 Ruth Aarons (1918–1980), American table tennis player
 Sam Aarons (1895–1971), Australian radical activist and communist
 Sarah Aarons (born 1994), Australian songwriter 
 Slim Aarons (1916–2006), American photographer

See also
 Aaron (surname)
 Aron (name)
 Arron, given name and surname
 Aaronson, surname

References 

Jewish surnames
English-language surnames
Patronymic surnames